Umayya may refer to:

Banu Umayya (or Umayyad dynasty), prominent clan of the Quraysh tribe and ruling dynasty of the Umayyad Caliphate
Umayyah ibn Khalaf, opponent of the Islamic prophet Muhammad
Umayya ibn Abd Shams, progenitor of the Banu Umayya
Umayya ibn Abdallah ibn Khalid ibn Asid, Umayyad prince and governor from collateral branch of the dynasty